The discography of Sofia Rotaru.

Studio albums 
 1972 Chervona Ruta
 1973 Poet Sofia Rotaru
 1974 Sofia Rotaru (aka Ballada o skripkakh)
 1976 Sofia Rotaru (aka Lebedinaya vernost)
 1977 Sofia Rotaru poet pesni Vladimira Ivasyuka
 1978 Sofia Rotaru (aka Rodina moya)
 1979 Tolko tebe
 1981 Where Has Love Gone? (songs from the film)
 1981 Sofia Rotaru and Chervona Ruta (split-release with Where Has Love Gone?)
 1985 Tender Melody
 1987 Monologue of Love
 1987 Lavanda
 1988 Heart of Gold
 1991 Caravan of Love
 1995 Khutoryanka
 1998 Lyubi menya
 2002 Ya tebya po-prezhnemu lyublyu
 2004 Nebo – eto ya
 2005 Ya zhe yego lyubila
 2008 Ya – tvoya lybov'!
 2010 Ya ne oglyanus

Compilations 
 1975 Modern Ukraine with Sophia Rotaru
 1977 Krymskiye zori (split with Krymskiye zori & Lyudmila Moskvitina)
 1980 Sofia Rotaru / Lev Leshchenko (split with Lev Leshchenko)
 1980 Visit to Ukraine
 1983 Canadian Tour 1983
 1984 Sofia Rotaru
 1991 Sofia Rotaru (aka Romantika)
 1993 Lavanda
 1993 Sofia Rotaru (aka Karavan lyubvi)
 1995 Zolotyye pesni 1985/95
 1996 Noch lyubvi
 1996 Chervona ruta. Poyet Sofia Rotaru
 2002 Snezhnaya koroleva
 2003 Yedynomu...
 2003 Listopad
 2003 Lyubovnoye nastroyeniye
 2004 Lavanda, khutoryanka, daleye vezde...
 2004 Teche voda
 2005 Kogda rastsvetayet lyubov
 2007 Serdtse ty moe
 2007 Tuman
 2011 I letit moya dusha...
 2013 Zolotyye pesni 2008–2013
 2014 Sofia Rotaru
 2021 Luchshiye pesni

Selected songs 
 1972 Chervona Ruta
 1978 Deine Zärtlichkeit
 1981 Kray, miy ridniy kray
 1983 Melancolie
 1985 Lavanda
 2004 Nebo – eto ya

External links 
 Discography on Sofia Rotaru official site
 Radio and television hit parades positions for Sofia Rotaru
 Statistical data on creation of Sofia Rotaru (singles, EP's, albums, films)
 Rating of the most popular Russian singers in Russia in 2003 (Magazine «7 Days (Moscow, Russia) together with sociological company "TNS Gallup Media")
 CDandLP.com
 Discography of Sofia Rotaru on popsa.info
 Compact discs of Sofia Rotaru sofiarotaru.com
 Vinyl discs if Sofia Rotaru sofiarotaru.com
 Sofia Rotaru - Discography (Vinyl discs) fortuna-rotaru.narod.ru
 Sofia Rotaru - Discography (Laser discs) fortuna-rotaru.narod.ru
 tophit.ru charts - Contemporary Media Technologies

Discography
Discographies of Ukrainian artists
Pop music discographies
Folk music discographies